Walter Aníbal Acevedo (born February 16, 1986) is an Argentine football midfielder who most recently played for C.S.D. Municipal.

Career
Acevedo has played for San Lorenzo since 2005, in 2007 he helped the club to win the Clausura tournament. In January 2009, he was signed by FC Metalist Kharkiv but was not important in the team because he did not adapt well to his surroundings in a country that was not his own. On July 3, 2009 Independiente signed the center midfielder on loan from Ukrainian club Metalist Kharkov until December 2009 because of his inability to adapt and his strong desire to return to Argentina. In July 2012, Acevedo was in talks with Colo Colo to play in Chile, but River Plate wanted to retain him for the Apertura.

Acevedo joined Municipal in June 2018, before leaving the club again at the end of the year.

International career
Acevedo has represented the Argentina national team at Under-17 and under-20 levels. He made his full international debut for the Argentina national team after being called up to join Diego Maradona's squad of Argentina-based players who beat Jamaica 2–1 on February 10, 2010.

Honours
San Lorenzo
Argentine Primera División: Clausura 2007

References

External links
 
 
 Statistics at Football-Lineups
 

1986 births
Living people
People from La Matanza Partido
Argentina international footballers
Argentine Primera División players
San Lorenzo de Almagro footballers
Argentine expatriate footballers
Argentine footballers
Expatriate footballers in Ukraine
FC Metalist Kharkiv players
Club Atlético Independiente footballers
Club Atlético River Plate footballers
Club Atlético Banfield footballers
Real Zaragoza players
Club Atlético Tigre footballers
Defensa y Justicia footballers
Ukrainian Premier League players
Association football midfielders
Argentine expatriate sportspeople in Spain
Argentine expatriate sportspeople in Ukraine
Sportspeople from Buenos Aires Province